Dong Jianjun (born 18 May 1988), known by his ring name Taishan Dong, is a Chinese undefeated professional boxer who fights at heavyweight.

Amateur career
Dong initially started out in basketball, hockey  and kickboxing, taking the ring name Taishan after the mountain of the same name. In February 2013, he floored Bob Sapp in a kickboxing fight held in Tokyo. Dong met with boxing promoter Liu Gang who persuaded him to take up professional boxing.

Professional boxing career
After arriving to the US at the start of 2014 with ambitions to become a professional boxer, Dong met with attorney George Gallegos. Gallegos, who would later become his manager, introduced him to boxing trainer John Bray. Dong did not understand English at the time and Bray was unable to speak Chinese but the pair bonded over their shared interest in boxing. In July, Dong fought his professional debut against Alex Rozman (2-6-0), which Dong won in a second-round technical knockout. His next fight came in November, knocking out Tommy Washington Jr. (3-6-0) in just over two and a half first round minutes. In February 2015, Dong defeated Rory McCrary (3-2-0) in a unanimous decision over four rounds. Judges scored the fight 40-34, 40-34 and 39-35 in Dong's favor. His next fight came on the Canelo vs Kirkland undercard where he faced Jamal woods, Dong won the contest over 4 rounds in a majority decision win with the judges scoring the bout 40-36, 39-37 and one judge scoring it even at 38-38.

Dong's height has seen him being promoted as the "Yao Ming of boxing". He is currently signed to Golden Boy Promotions and trains with Buddy McGirt. Dong was offered a contract with Top Rank, who wanted to focus on expanding his reputation in Asia, but chose to sign with Golden Boy because they offered to develop him first in the US.

On Oct 14, 2017, Dong took part in a three-day talent tryout at the WWE Performance Center in Orlando, FL. On July 17, 2018, Dong was announced as part of the latest class of WWE recruits. On December 15 2018, it was announced that he had left WWE voluntarily.

Professional boxing record
{| class="wikitable" style="text-align:center;"
| style="text-align:center;" colspan="8" | 6 Wins (3 knockouts, 3 decisions),  0 Losses, 0 Draws
|-  style="text-align:center; background:#e3e3e3;"
|  style="border-style:none none solid solid;" | Res.
|  style="border-style:none none solid solid;" | Record
|  style="border-style:none none solid solid;" | Opponent
|  style="border-style:none none solid solid;" | Type
|  style="border-style:none none solid solid;" | Rd., Time
|  style="border-style:none none solid solid;" | Date
|  style="border-style:none none solid solid;" | Location
|  style="border-style:none none solid solid;" | Notes
|- align=center
| Win
| 6–0
| align=left |  Daniel Arambula
|  || 
| 
| align=left | 
| align=left |

|- align=center
| Win
| 5–0
| align=left |  Lance Gauch
|  || 
| 
| align=left | 
| align=left |

|- align=center
| Win
| 4–0
| align=left |  Jamal Woods
|  || 
| 
| align=left | 
| align=left |

|- align=center
| Win
| 3–0
| align=left |  Roy McCrary
|  || 
| 
| align=left | 
| align=left | 
|- align=center
| Win
| 2–0
| align=left |  Tommy Washington Jr.
|  || 
| 
| align=left | 
| align=left | 
|- align=center
| Win
| 1–0
| align=left |  Alex Rozman
|  || 
| 
| align=left | 
| align=left |
|- align=center

References

External links
 

Living people
1988 births
Heavyweight boxers
Chinese male boxers
People from Lanzhou